Nong Khai province was formerly the northernmost of the northeastern (Isan) provinces (changwat) of Thailand until its eight eastern districts were split off to form Thailand's newest province, Bueng Kan province, in 2011. Nong Khai province lies in upper northeastern Thailand. Nearby provinces are (clockwise, from the east): Bueng Kan, Sakon Nakhon, Udon Thani, and Loei. To the north it borders Vientiane province, Vientiane Prefecture, and Bolikhamsai province of Laos.

Geography
The province is in the valley of the Mae Nam Kong (Mekong River), which also forms the border with Laos. There are highlands to the south. The Laotian capital, Vientiane, is only  from the provincial capital of Nong Khai. The First Thai–Lao Friendship Bridge, which connects the two countries, was built jointly by the governments of Thailand, Laos, and Australia, and was opened in 1994.

Nong Khai is the smallest province in the northeastern after Bueng Kan and other seven districts became Bueng Kan province in 2011.

History

Over the centuries, control of the province swung between the Thai Kingdom Ayutthaya, and the Laotian kingdom Lan Xang, as their respective powers ebbed and flowed in the region.

The Prap Ho Monument in front of the historic city hall (now a museum and cultural center) memorializes the war dead of the Haw wars.

In more recent years, Nong Khai has become a popular destination during the Buddhist Lent festival when mysterious balls of light, or Naga fireballs, rise from the Mekong River. The balls resemble an orange sun. They rise out of the river approximately 6–9 meters (20 to 30 feet) and disappear after three to five seconds. Although the fireballs can be seen at other times, most Thais travel to see them during the full moon in October when the incidence of them is considered to be much higher.

Nong Khai's main sight is Sala Keoku (alternatively spelled as Sala Kaew Ku, also known as Wat Khaek), a park of colossal sculptures, some over 20 m tall.  The park is the handiwork of the mystic Luang Pu Bunleua Sulilat, who bought the land in 1978 when he was exiled from his native Laos, where he had built a similar park in Vientiane in the 1950s.  Synthesizing Buddhist and Hinduist ideologies, Buddhas, many-armed goddesses, a seven-headed Naga snake, and various human-animal hybrids dominate the site.

Notable figures from twentieth century Buddhist history have lived in Nong Khai—the world renowned Buddhist scholar and leading meditation teacher Ajahn Sumedho ordained in Wat Sisaket in Nong Khai.

Symbols
The provincial seal shows a pond with a bamboo clump close to it. The bamboo symbolizes stability, glory, and continuity for the peaceful and fertile land.

The provincial tree is the tamalan or Burma pallisander (Dalbergia oliveri).

The provincial aquatic life is the seven-striped barb or Jullien's golden carp (Probarbus jullieni).

Administrative divisions

Provincial government

As of 23 March 2011, the province is divided into nine districts (amphoes). The districts are further divided into 62 subdistricts (tambons) and 705 villages (mubans). The eight districts of Bueng Kan were districts of Nong Khai before they were split off to form Bueng Kan province.

 Mueang Nong Khai
 Tha Bo
 Phon Phisai
 Si Chiang Mai
 Sangkhom
 Sakhrai
 Fao Rai
 Rattanawapi
 Pho Tak

Local government
As of 26 November 2019 there are: one Nong Khai Provincial Administration Organisation and 19 municipal (thesaban) areas in the province. Nong Khai and Tha Bo have town (thesaban mueang) status. Further 17 subdistrict municipalities (thesaban tambon). The non-municipal areas are administered by 48 Subdistrict Administrative Organisations - SAO (ongkan borihan suan tambon).

Transport

Air
The nearest airport is Udon Thani International Airport, 56 km from Nong Khai.

Rail

The main railway station in Nong Khai is Nong Khai railway station. This station can be considered the destination of the Upper Northeastern Railway Line (only in Thailand's area).

Road
The Thai–Lao Friendship Bridge was largely funded by a gift to the Lao government from the Australian government. It is the road and railway gateway to Laos's capital, Vientiane ( upriver), on the north bank opposite the Thai town of Si Chiang Mai District.  Construction of a rail spur to Thanaleng outside of Vientiane was begun early-2007 and  officially opened 5 March 2009.

Nong Khai is 626 km north of Bangkok and 60 km north of Udon Thani.

Human achievement index 2017

The Human achievement index (HAI), a composite index covering eight key areas of human development, has been tracked by National Economic and Social Development Board (NESDB) since 2017.

References

External links

Provincial website 
Nong Khai Travel Guide

 
Isan
Provinces of Thailand
Populated places on the Mekong River